The Boys Doubles tournament of the 2014 BWF World Junior Championships was held on April 13–18. Last year winners Li Junhui and Liu Yuchen could not defend their title due to age eligibility.

Thai pair Kittinupong Ketlen / Dechapol Puavaranukroh won the final against Masahide Nakata / Katsuki Tamate by 21-16, 21-18 and grabbed the title.

Seeded

  Huang Kaixiang / Zheng Siwei (quarter-final)
  Choi Jong-woo / Lee Kwang-eon (first round)
  Yonny Chung / Yeung Shing Choi (quarter-final)
  Kittinupong Ketlen / Dechapol Puavaranukroh (champion)
  Rodion Alimov / Alexandr Kozyrev (second round)
  Alexander Bond / Joel Eipe (quarter-final)
  He Jiting / Zhao Jian (third round)
  Kim Jae-hwan / Kim Jung-ho (semi-final)
  Sachin Angodavidanalage / Buwenaka Goonathileka (first round)
  Muhammad Rian Ardianto / Clinton Hendrik Kudamasa (semi-final)
  Althof Baariq / Reinard Dhanriano (third round)
  Mathias Bay-Smidt / Frederik Sogaard Mortensen (third round)
  Do Tuan Duc / Pham Hong Nam (second round)
  Ruben Jille / Alex Vlaar (third round)
  Ben Lane / Sean Vendy (third round)
  Hashiru Shimono / Kanta Tsuneyama (second round)

Draw

Finals

Top Half

Section 1

Section 2

Section 3

Section 4

Bottom Half

Section 5

Section 6

Section 7

Section 8

References
Main Draw

2014 BWF World Junior Championships
2014 in youth sport